Billy Parish (born September 11, 1981) is an American environmental entrepreneur, author, and activist. He is the co-founder and CEO of Mosaic Inc., a leading financing platform for U.S. residential solar and sustainable home improvements.

Early life
Parish grew up in Manhattan, New York City. His father, a lawyer, specialized in finance for electronic utilities. His mother, also a lawyer, met his father while working on a securitization deal. He spent a semester of high school at The Mountain School in Vermont, where he was turned on to working for the environment. In July 2005 he led a three-day fast in front of the White House to draw attention to the 150,000 deaths caused each year by climate change.
He designed his own major in sustainable economic developments at Yale University.
However, in 2002, he left Yale University and went on to found the Energy Action Coalition, renamed the Power Shift Network. The Coalition became the largest youth-led clean energy advocacy network in the world, bringing together 50 environmental and social justice groups and over 340,000 members. The coalition raised nearly $10 million in four years and helped more than 600 colleges make commitments to climate neutrality.

In March 2009, the Energy Action Coalition organized Power Shift '09, which brought over 12,000 young people to Washington D.C. for the largest climate-focused training, lobby day and non-violent civil disobedience action in U.S. history. 1Sky states Parish is on the Board of Directors. He is also co-chair of SolarAPP+ and board member and former board chair at The Solutions Project.

Career
Parish played a leading role in creating the Clean Energy Corps proposal to create 5 million new green jobs in the U.S., which was incorporated into the American Recovery and Reinvestment Act in 2009. He also helped to expand the AmeriCorps public service program to include a new “Clean Energy Service Corps”. with the idea that crowdfunding could affect a shift to green energy, Parish co-founded Mosaic. At that time, the company allowed individuals to micro invest in community-scale solar projects. In 2014, Parish shifted the company’s focus from crowdfunding to financing for residential solar projects, and in 2018, expanded to sustainable home improvements.

Personal life
Billy lives in Washington, D.C. with his wife and two daughters.

Awards and honors

 2017 - Rolling Stone's 25 People Shaping The Future
2014 - Fast Company's "20th Most Creative People in Business"
2012 - Middlebury College CSE Vision Award
2005 - Rolling Stone Magazine "Climate Hero"
2004 - Brower Youth Award

Writing
Parish has written over 50 articles for publications Inc., The Atlantic, HuffPost, and Grist.

Making Good: Finding Meaning, Money & Community in a Changing World

References 

Living people
1981 births
American environmentalists
Sustainability advocates
American non-fiction writers
HuffPost writers and columnists
Environmental bloggers